Carleigh Bennett Frilles (born April 11, 2002) is a footballer who plays as a midfielder for the Coastal Carolina Chanticleers. Born in the United States, she represents the Philippines women's national team.

Early life
Frilles was born in Fairfax, Virginia and raised in Haymarket, Virginia. She has attended the Battlefield High School.

College career
Frilles has attended the Coastal Carolina University.

International career

Philippines Youth
In 2016, Frilles was called-up to represent the Philippines U14 team in the AFC U14 Girls Regional Championship 2016 held in Vientiane, Laos. The Philippines U14 team finished second in the tournament.

Philippines
Frilles has represented the Philippines, making her senior debut at the 2022 AFC Women's Asian Cup. She previously played for the country's under-14 national team. Frilles scored her first international goals on her 20th birthday, April 11, 2022, in a friendly against Fiji, which the Philippines won 8–0. She went on to score five goals in the 16–0 record win in a friendly against Tonga on April 22, 2022.

International goals
 As of match played October 11, 2022. Philippines score listed first, score column indicates score after each Frilles goal.

Honours

International

Philippines U14
AFC U14 Girls Regional Championship runners-up: 2016

Philippines
Southeast Asian Games third place: 2021
AFF Women's Championship: 2022

References

External links

2002 births
Living people
Citizens of the Philippines through descent
Filipino women's footballers
Women's association football midfielders
Philippines women's international footballers
Sportspeople from Fairfax, Virginia
Soccer players from Virginia
People from Haymarket, Virginia
Sportspeople from the Washington metropolitan area
American women's soccer players
Coastal Carolina Chanticleers women's soccer players
American sportspeople of Filipino descent
Southeast Asian Games bronze medalists for the Philippines
Southeast Asian Games medalists in football